Vrashka Chuka or Vrška čuka (Serbian Cyrillic:) is a peak in the Balkan Mountains, situated on the border between Bulgaria and Serbia. Vrashka Chuka is the most northwestern peak in the Balkan mountains and part of Babin Nos mountain. Vrashka Chuka Pass is located to the north of the peak. There is a border checkpoint between Bulgaria and Serbia in the pass. The closest towns to the peak are Kula to the northeast and Zaječar to the northwest.

Mountains of Bulgaria
Mountains of Serbia
Balkan mountains
Bulgaria–Serbia border
International mountains of Europe
Bulgaria–Serbia border crossings
Landforms of Vidin Province
Kula Municipality, Bulgaria